Gabriel Oliveira Constantino (born 9 February 1995) is a Brazilian hurdler. He is the current South American record holder in the 110m hurdles, with a time of 13.18. Constantino finished 6th in the men's 60 metres hurdles at the 2018 IAAF World Indoor Championships.  He advanced to the final on time, being the second fastest and final non-automatic qualifier.  To qualify for the championships, he equaled at national and South American record of 7.60 seconds.

In 2018, in France, he broke the South American record for 110m hurdles with a time of 13.23. In July 2019, in Hungary, he hit again the South American record of 110m hurdles, with a time of 13.18.

At the 2019 Pan American Games in Lima, Gabriel arrived as a favorite for gold and qualified for the final in 1st place, with a time of 13.42. However, in the final, he tripped over one of the obstacles, finishing in last place.

He competed at the 2020 Summer Olympics.

Personal bests
110 m hurdles: 13.18 (wind: +0.8 m/s) –  Székesfehérvár, 9 July 2019
100 m: 10.28 (wind: +0.6 m/s) –  Bragança Paulista, 8 July 2018
200 m: 20.21 (wind: +0.9 m/s) –  Bragança Paulista, 28 April 2019
 relay: 38.33 –  Bragança Paulista, 15 September 2018
60 m hurdles: 7.60 –  São Caetano do Sul, 17 Jan 2018

International competitions

1Disqualified in the final
2Did not finish in the final

References

External links

1995 births
Living people
Brazilian male hurdlers
Athletes (track and field) at the 2019 Pan American Games
Pan American Games athletes for Brazil
South American Championships in Athletics winners
Universiade gold medalists in athletics (track and field)
Universiade gold medalists for Brazil
Competitors at the 2017 Summer Universiade
Medalists at the 2019 Summer Universiade
Ibero-American Championships in Athletics winners
Athletes (track and field) at the 2020 Summer Olympics
Olympic athletes of Brazil
Athletes from Rio de Janeiro (city)
21st-century Brazilian people
20th-century Brazilian people